Noah Greenberg (April 9, 1919 – January 9, 1966) was an American choral conductor.

Greenberg was born in the Bronx. In 1937, aged 18, he joined the Socialist Workers Party of Max Shachtman, and worked as a lathe operator and party activist. He lost work-related draft deferment in 1944 and joined the U.S. Merchant Marine till 1949. By this time he had lost interest in formal politics.

Greenberg, although self-taught, had been conducting amateur choruses such as that of the International Ladies' Garment Workers Union, and by 1950 was known as a choral conductor. Greenberg founded New York Pro Musica in 1952, signing with Esoteric Records of Greenwich Village, and recorded the first of 28 LP albums over the next 14 years.

W. H. Auden wrote of him, in regard to his having successfully revived interest in medieval, renaissance and baroque music, "To devote one’s musical career, as Noah Greenberg did, to works outside (the standard concert) repertory, calls for faith and courage of the highest order."

He died at University Hospital, Manhattan, after an apparent heart attack, on January 9, 1966. His death at only 46 apparently caused his mother to also die when she heard the news. The Noah Greenberg Award of the American Musicological Society, where he was a member, is named after him.

Select discography
New York Pro Musica: An Anthology of Their Greatest Works, Noah Greenberg, conductor. 7 record set. Everest Records (1966, Everest 3145/7)
New York Pro Musica. Elizabethan and Jacobean Ayres, Madrigals and Dances. Directed by Noah Greenberg. Decca DL 9406, [1959], LP.

References

External links 
 Noah Greenberg at Find a Grave
 

American choral conductors
American male conductors (music)
Musicians from the Bronx
1919 births
1966 deaths
20th-century American conductors (music)
20th-century American male musicians
Burials at Beth David Cemetery